Fishfin Ridge is a  mountain ridge located in Lemhi County, Idaho, United States.

Description
Fishfin Ridge is part of the Bighorn Crags in the Salmon River Mountains which are a subset of the Rocky Mountains. The remote ridge is situated 30 miles west of Salmon, Idaho, in the Frank Church–River of No Return Wilderness. An approach is possible from July through October via a multi-day backpacking trip along trails. Precipitation runoff from the mountain drains to the Salmon River via Clear Creek (north slope) and Wilson Creek (south slope). This landform's toponym has been officially adopted by the United States Board on Geographic Names, and the highest point is unofficially known as "Knuckle Peak." The first ascent of Knuckle Peak was made by Lincoln Hales and Pete Schoening in 1955. Fishfin Ridge was named in 1962 by Dr. Paul Dilke of University of Idaho because it looks like a dorsal fin of a prehistoric fish.

Climate
Based on the Köppen climate classification, Fishfin Ridge is located in an alpine subarctic climate zone with long, cold, snowy winters, and cool to warm summers. Winter temperatures can drop below −10 °F with wind chill factors below −30 °F.

See also
 List of mountain peaks of Idaho

References

External links
 Fishfin Ridge: Idaho: A Climbing Guide
 Fishfin Ridge: weather forecast
 Fishfin Ridge (photo): Flickr

Mountains of Idaho
Ridges of Idaho
Mountains of Lemhi County, Idaho
North American 2000 m summits
Salmon-Challis National Forest